The Aviatik C.I was an observation aircraft which came into service during World War I in April 1915.  It was a development of the Aviatik B.I and B.II models, being one of first aircraft of the new German C class of armed biplanes. In the C.I the observer sat in front of the pilot, with a machine-gun clipped on a sliding mounting fitted on a rail at either side of the cockpit. It gave the crew the means to attack enemy aircraft.  The positions of the pilot and observer were reversed in last series of 50, ordered in 1917 solely for trainer purpose. There was only one aircraft built of refined C.Ia version in May 1916, with armament still in a forward cab, serving as a prototype for C.III.  Later models of the plane included the Aviatik C.II and the C.III, which had more powerful engines.  The C.III was produced in large numbers.

548 Aviatik C.I were built in total: 402 by Aviatik (including 51 trainers and 1 C.Ia) and 146 by Hannover.

Variants
C.I
Primary model
C.I(Han) 
Primary model licence-built by Hannover, initially designated Hannover C.I
C.I trainer
Last series of 50 plus a prototype manufactured in 1917, with a machine gun in rear cab.
C.Ia 
Prototype for C.III, flown in May–June 1916.
C.II
This model was powered by a 149 kW (200 hp) Benz Bz.IV engine. it was not produced in quantity.
C.III
The C.III was a 1916 refinement which was operated until 1917.

Operators

KuKLFT

Luftstreitkrafte

Romanian Air Corps

Royal Yugoslav Air Force - Postwar

Specifications

Notes

References

Gray, Peter and Thetford, Owen. German Aircraft of the First World War. New York: Doubleday & Company, 1970.
Herris, Jack and Pearson, Bob. Aviatik Aircraft of World War I. Aeronaut Books, 2014.

van Wyngarden, G. Early German Aces of World War 1. Oxford: Osprey Publishing, 2006. 
Taylor, Michael J H. Jane's Encyclopedia of Aviation. Portland House, 1989.

External links
July 14, 2011 1915 Wrecked Aviatik C.I postcard

1910s German military reconnaissance aircraft
Military aircraft of World War I
C.I
Single-engined tractor aircraft
Biplanes
Aircraft first flown in 1915